The Bristol Sessions were a series of recording sessions held in 1927 in Bristol, Tennessee, considered by some as the "Big Bang" of modern country music. The recordings were made by Victor Talking Machine Company producer Ralph Peer. Bristol was one of the stops on a two-month, $60,000 trip that took Peer through several major southern cities and yielded important recordings of blues, ragtime, gospel, ballads, topical songs, and string bands. The Bristol Sessions marked the commercial debuts of Jimmie Rodgers and the Carter Family. As a result of the influence of these recording sessions, Bristol has been called the "birthplace of country music". Since 2014, the town has been home to the Birthplace of Country Music Museum.

Country music before the Sessions
Commercial recordings of country music had begun in 1922. Among these very early artists were Vernon Dalhart, who recorded the million-selling Wreck of the Old 97, Ernest Stoneman from Galax, Virginia, Henry Whitter, A.C. (Eck) Robertson, who recorded the first documented country record along with Henry C. Gilliland ("Sallie Gooden" b/w "Arkansaw Traveler"), and Uncle Dave Macon. However, any "hillbilly" artists who recorded had to travel to the New York City studios of the major labels, and many artists, including Dalhart, were not true "hillbilly" artists but instead crossed over from other genres.

Okeh Records and later Columbia Records had sent producers around the South in an attempt to discover new talent. Peer, who worked for Okeh at the time, recorded Fiddlin' John Carson using the old acoustic method (known for its large intrusive sound-gathering horn) in 1923, at the behest of the Okeh dealer in Atlanta, Georgia, Polk Brockman. Despite Peer's belief that the record was of poor quality, the 500 copies made of “The Little Old Log Cabin in the Lane” and “The Old Hen Cackled and the Rooster’s Going to Crow” sold out in weeks. This experience convinced Peer of the potential for “hillbilly” music.

Peer left Okeh for the Victor Talking Machine Company, taking a salary of $1 per year. However, Peer owned the publishing rights to all the recordings he made. Peer's arrangement of paying royalties to artists based on sales is the basis for record contracts today, and the company he founded, Peermusic, remains in existence today.

The birth of electrical recording in 1925 allowed records to have a sound better than radio, which had threatened to reduce the recording industry to irrelevance in the early 1920s. This new method allowed softer instruments such as dulcimers, guitars and jaw harps to be heard, and it also meant recording equipment was somewhat more portable — and as such, recordings could be made nearly anywhere (the cumbersome acoustic equipment was not really portable.)

Peer asked Ernest Stoneman, who had recorded for Okeh, how to find more rural talent. Stoneman convinced Peer to travel through southern Appalachia and record artists who would have been unable to travel to New York. Peer recognized the potential with the mountain music, as even residents of Appalachia who didn't have electricity often owned hand-cranked Victrolas, or other phonographs. He decided to make a trip, hoping to record blues, gospel and "hillbilly" music. Artists were paid $50 cash on the spot for each side cut, and 2½ cents for each single sold.

In February and March, he made a trip recording blues and gospel music, and decided to make another trip. He decided to make a stop in Savannah, Georgia and Charlotte, North Carolina. He settled on Bristol (at the urging of Stoneman) as a third stop, because with Johnson City and Kingsport, Tennessee, it formed the Tri-Cities, the largest urban area in the Appalachians at the time. In addition, three other record companies had held or were scheduling auditions for Bristol. So Peer set out with his wife and two engineers for Bristol.

The Sessions
Between 25 July and 5 August 1927, Peer held recording sessions on the third floor of the Taylor-Christian Hat and Glove Company on State Street, which is the state line in Bristol. He placed advertisements in the local newspapers, which did not receive much response aside from artists who had already traveled to New York (such as the Powers Family) or were already known by Stoneman.

Stoneman was the first to record with Peer, on 25 July 1927. He recorded with his wife Hattie, Eck Dunford and Mooney Brewer. Other acts, including the Johnson Brothers vaudeville duo (best known for their Crime of The D'Autremont Brothers) and a church choir, filled out the rest of July. However, these artists were only enough to fill the first week of recordings and Peer needed to fill out his second week.

A newspaper article about one of Stoneman's recordings (Skip To Ma Lou, My Darling), which stressed the $3,600 in royalties that Stoneman had received in 1926 and the $100/day that he was receiving for recording in Bristol, generated much more interest. Dozens of artists went to Bristol, many of whom had never been to Bristol. He scheduled night sessions to accommodate the extra talent, which included Jimmie Rodgers. Rodgers had a disagreement with the band in which he was a member over what name to record under, and so Rodgers recorded solo and the band recorded as the Tenneva Ramblers. Rodgers and the band found out about the sessions only when they stayed at the boarding house run by the mother of one band member.

The arrival of the Carter Family was more expected. Ralph Peer had corresponded with the family earlier in the summer, but later wrote that "he was still surprised to see them," primarily due to their appearance. "They wander in," Peer told Lillian Borgeson during a series of interviews in 1959. "He's dressed in overalls and the women are country women from way back there. They looked like hillbillies. But as soon as I heard Sara's voice, that was it. I knew it was going to be wonderful." The Carters recorded four songs on the second Monday of the sessions and two the next day. On 1 August, Sara sang lead while playing autoharp, A.P. sang bass, and 18-year-old Maybelle played guitar with an unusual and subsequently influential style that allowed her to provide both melody and rhythm. The Victor Company released the first Carter Family record, "Poor Orphan Child" and "The Wandering Boy," on 4 November 1927.

The 1927 sessions recorded 76 songs, recorded by 19 performers or performing groups.

A second group of sessions was made by Peer in 1928, but the artistic success was not duplicated. In those twelve days in 1927 in Bristol, Tennessee, Peer had managed to fully introduce America to the authentic music of southern Appalachia. The results were two new superstars, The Carter Family and Jimmie Rodgers.

Compilation releases

In 1987, the Country Music Foundation issued a Grammy Award-nominated two-LP set, The Bristol Sessions, with 35 tracks. This was reissued on CD in 1991. In 2011, Bear Family Records issued a Grammy Award-nominated five-CD box set The Bristol Sessions: The Big Bang of Country Music 1927-1928 containing 124 tracks and a 120-page hardcover book.

In 2015, Sony Legacy Recordings released Orthophonic Joy: The 1927 Bristol Sessions Revisited as a benefit for the Birthplace of Country Music Museum. The two-CD set pays homage to the original 1927 sessions with 18 songs updated by some of country music's biggest stars, such as Dolly Parton and Brad Paisley. WSM disc jockey and country music historian Eddie Stubbs narrates 19 tracks that tell the story of the 1927 recording sessions.

Recording details
Click on a label to change the sorting.

See also
 Johnson City sessions
 Music of East Tennessee

References

External links
 
 Birthplace of Country Music Alliance
 The Bristol Sessions: Writings About the Big Bang of Country Music
 The Bristol Sessions, 1927-1928: The Big Bang of Country Music

1927 in music
1927 in Tennessee
American country music
Appalachian music
Bristol, Tennessee
East Tennessee
Music of East Tennessee
United States National Recording Registry recordings